Haryana is a 2022 Indian Hindi language romantic comedy film starring Yash Tonk, Ashlesha Sawant, Robbie Marih, Monica Sharma and Aakarshan Singh. The film is directed, story and screenplay by Sandeep Baswana. Television actress Ashlesha Sawant will mark her Bollywood debut with Haryana.

Cast
 Yash Tonk as Mahender
 Ashlesha Sawant as Bimla
 Robbie Mairh as Jaibeer
 Monica Sharma as Vasudha
 Aakarshan Singh as Jugnu

References

External links 
 
 https://www.cinestaan.com/movies/haryana-50908
 https://www.filmibeat.com/bollywood/movies/haryana.html#story
 https://www.bollywoodproduct.com/bollywood-movie/haryana-2022

2022 romantic comedy films
2020s Hindi-language films
2022 films
Indian romantic comedy films